Mathematical and theoretical biology, or biomathematics, is a branch of biology which employs theoretical analysis, mathematical models and abstractions of the living organisms to investigate the principles that govern the structure, development and behavior of the systems, as opposed to experimental biology which deals with the conduction of experiments to prove and validate the scientific theories. The field is sometimes called mathematical biology or biomathematics to stress the mathematical side, or theoretical biology to stress the biological side. Theoretical biology focuses more on the development of theoretical principles for biology while mathematical biology focuses on the use of mathematical tools to study biological systems, even though the two terms are sometimes interchanged.

Mathematical biology aims at the mathematical representation and modeling of biological processes, using techniques and tools of applied mathematics. It can be useful in both theoretical and practical research. Describing systems in a quantitative manner means their behavior can be better simulated, and hence properties can be predicted that might not be evident to the experimenter. This requires precise mathematical models.

Because of the complexity of the living systems, theoretical biology employs several fields of mathematics, and has contributed to the development of new techniques.

History

Early history
Mathematics has been used in biology as early as the 13th century, when Fibonacci used the famous Fibonacci series to describe a growing population of rabbits. In the 18th century Daniel Bernoulli applied mathematics to describe the effect of smallpox on the human population. Thomas Malthus' 1789 essay on the growth of the human population was based on the concept of exponential growth. Pierre François Verhulst formulated the logistic growth model in 1836.

Fritz Müller described the evolutionary benefits of what is now called Müllerian mimicry in 1879, in an account notable for being the first use of a mathematical argument in evolutionary ecology to show how powerful the effect of natural selection would be, unless one includes Malthus's discussion of the effects of population growth that influenced Charles Darwin: Malthus argued that growth would be exponential (he uses the word "geometric") while resources (the environment's carrying capacity) could only grow arithmetically.

The term "theoretical biology" was first used as a monograph title by Johannes Reinke in 1901, and soon after by Jakob von Uexküll in 1920. One founding text is considered to be On Growth and Form (1917) by D'Arcy Thompson, and other early pioneers include Ronald Fisher, Hans Leo Przibram, Vito Volterra, Nicolas Rashevsky and Conrad Hal Waddington.

Recent growth

Interest in the field has grown rapidly from the 1960s onwards. Some reasons for this include:
 The rapid growth of data-rich information sets,  due to the genomics revolution, which are difficult to understand without the use of analytical tools
 Recent development of mathematical tools such as chaos theory to help understand complex, non-linear mechanisms in biology
 An increase in computing power, which facilitates calculations and simulations not previously possible
 An increasing interest in in silico experimentation due to ethical considerations, risk, unreliability and other complications involved in human and animal research

Areas of research
Several areas of specialized research in mathematical and theoretical biology as well as external links to related projects in various universities are concisely presented in the following subsections, including also a large number of appropriate validating references from a list of several thousands of published authors contributing to this field. Many of the included examples are characterised by highly complex, nonlinear, and supercomplex mechanisms, as it is being increasingly recognised that the result of such interactions may only be understood through a combination of mathematical, logical, physical/chemical, molecular and computational models.

Abstract relational biology 
Abstract relational biology (ARB) is concerned with the study of general, relational models of complex biological systems, usually abstracting out specific morphological, or anatomical, structures. Some of the simplest models in ARB are the Metabolic-Replication, or (M,R)--systems introduced by Robert Rosen in 1957-1958 as abstract, relational models of cellular and organismal organization.

Other approaches include the notion of autopoiesis developed by Maturana and Varela, Kauffman's Work-Constraints cycles, and more recently the notion of closure of constraints.

Algebraic biology
Algebraic biology (also known as symbolic systems biology) applies the algebraic methods of symbolic computation to the study of biological problems, especially in genomics, proteomics, analysis of molecular structures and study of genes.

Complex systems biology 
An elaboration of systems biology to understand the more complex life processes was developed since 1970 in connection with molecular set theory, relational biology and algebraic biology.

Computer models and automata theory
A monograph on this topic summarizes an extensive amount of published research in this area up to 1986, including subsections in the following areas: computer modeling in biology and medicine, arterial system models, neuron models, biochemical and oscillation networks, quantum automata, quantum computers in molecular biology and genetics, cancer modelling, neural nets, genetic networks, abstract categories in relational biology, metabolic-replication systems, category theory applications in biology and medicine, automata theory, cellular automata, tessellation models and complete self-reproduction, chaotic systems in organisms, relational biology and organismic theories.

Modeling cell and molecular biology

This area has received a boost due to the growing importance of molecular biology.

Mechanics of biological tissues
Theoretical enzymology and enzyme kinetics
Cancer modelling and simulation
Modelling the movement of interacting cell populations
Mathematical modelling of scar tissue formation
Mathematical modelling of intracellular dynamics
Mathematical modelling of the cell cycle
Mathematical modelling of apoptosis

Modelling physiological systems

Modelling of arterial disease
Multi-scale modelling of the heart
Modelling electrical properties of muscle interactions, as in bidomain and monodomain models

Computational neuroscience 
Computational neuroscience (also known as theoretical neuroscience or mathematical neuroscience) is the theoretical study of the nervous system.

Evolutionary biology
Ecology and evolutionary biology have traditionally been the dominant fields of mathematical biology.

Evolutionary biology has been the subject of extensive mathematical theorizing. The traditional approach in this area, which includes complications from genetics, is population genetics. Most population geneticists consider the appearance of new alleles by mutation, the appearance of new genotypes by recombination, and changes in the frequencies of existing alleles and genotypes at a small number of gene loci. When infinitesimal effects at a large number of gene loci are considered, together with the assumption of linkage equilibrium or quasi-linkage equilibrium, one derives quantitative genetics. Ronald Fisher made fundamental advances in statistics, such as analysis of variance, via his work on quantitative genetics. Another important branch of population genetics that led to the extensive development of coalescent theory is phylogenetics. Phylogenetics is an area that deals with the reconstruction and analysis of phylogenetic (evolutionary) trees and networks based on inherited characteristics Traditional population genetic models deal with alleles and genotypes, and are frequently stochastic.

Many population genetics models assume that population sizes are constant. Variable population sizes, often in the absence of genetic variation, are treated by the field of population dynamics. Work in this area dates back to the 19th century, and even as far as 1798 when Thomas Malthus formulated the first principle of population dynamics, which later became known as the Malthusian growth model. The Lotka–Volterra predator-prey equations are another famous example. Population dynamics overlap with another active area of research in mathematical biology: mathematical epidemiology, the study of infectious disease affecting populations. Various models of the spread of infections have been proposed and analyzed, and provide important results that may be applied to health policy decisions.

In evolutionary game theory, developed first by John Maynard Smith and George R. Price, selection acts directly on inherited phenotypes, without genetic complications. This approach has been mathematically refined to produce the field of adaptive dynamics.

Mathematical biophysics 
The earlier stages of mathematical biology were dominated by mathematical biophysics, described as the application of mathematics in biophysics, often involving specific physical/mathematical models of biosystems and their components or compartments.

The following is a list of mathematical descriptions and their assumptions.

Deterministic processes (dynamical systems)
A fixed mapping between an initial state and a final state. Starting from an initial condition and moving forward in time, a deterministic process always generates the same trajectory, and no two trajectories cross in state space.

Difference equations/Maps – discrete time, continuous state space.
Ordinary differential equations – continuous time, continuous state space, no spatial derivatives. See also: Numerical ordinary differential equations.
 Partial differential equations – continuous time, continuous state space, spatial derivatives. See also: Numerical partial differential equations.
 Logical deterministic cellular automata – discrete time, discrete state space. See also: Cellular automaton.

Stochastic processes (random dynamical systems)
A random mapping between an initial state and a final state, making the state of the system a random variable with a corresponding probability distribution.

 Non-Markovian processes – generalized master equation – continuous time with memory of past events, discrete state space, waiting times of events (or transitions between states) discretely occur.
 Jump Markov process – master equation – continuous time with no memory of past events, discrete state space, waiting times between events discretely occur and are exponentially distributed. See also: Monte Carlo method for numerical simulation methods, specifically dynamic Monte Carlo method and Gillespie algorithm.
 Continuous Markov process – stochastic differential equations or a Fokker–Planck equation – continuous time, continuous state space, events occur continuously according to a random Wiener process.

Spatial modelling
One classic work in this area is Alan Turing's paper on morphogenesis entitled The Chemical Basis of Morphogenesis, published in 1952 in the Philosophical Transactions of the Royal Society.
Travelling waves in a wound-healing assay
Swarming behaviour
A mechanochemical theory of morphogenesis
Biological pattern formation
Spatial distribution modeling using plot samples
Turing patterns

Mathematical methods 
A model of a biological system is converted into a system of equations, although the word 'model' is often used synonymously with the system of corresponding equations. The solution of the equations, by either analytical or numerical means, describes how the biological system behaves either over time or at equilibrium. There are many different types of equations and the type of behavior that can occur is dependent on both the model and the equations used. The model often makes assumptions about the system. The equations may also make assumptions about the nature of what may occur.

Molecular set theory 
Molecular set theory (MST) is a mathematical formulation of the wide-sense chemical kinetics of biomolecular reactions in terms of sets of molecules and their chemical transformations represented by set-theoretical mappings between molecular sets. It was introduced by Anthony Bartholomay, and its applications were developed in mathematical biology and especially in mathematical medicine.
In a more general sense, MST is the theory of molecular categories defined as categories of molecular sets and their chemical transformations represented as set-theoretical mappings of molecular sets. The theory has also contributed to biostatistics and the formulation of clinical biochemistry problems in mathematical formulations of pathological, biochemical changes of interest to Physiology, Clinical Biochemistry and Medicine.

Organizational biology
Theoretical approaches to biological organization aim to understand the interdependence between the parts of organisms. They emphasize the circularities that these interdependences lead to. Theoretical biologists developed several concepts to formalize this idea.

For example, abstract relational biology (ARB) is concerned with the study of general, relational models of complex biological systems, usually abstracting out specific morphological, or anatomical, structures. Some of the simplest models in ARB are the Metabolic-Replication, or (M,R)--systems introduced by Robert Rosen in 1957-1958 as abstract, relational models of cellular and organismal organization.

Model example: the cell cycle 

The eukaryotic cell cycle is very complex and is one of the most studied topics, since its misregulation leads to cancers.
It is possibly a good example of a mathematical model as it deals with simple calculus but gives valid results.  Two research groups  have produced several models of the cell cycle simulating several organisms. They have recently produced a generic eukaryotic cell cycle model that can represent a particular eukaryote depending on the values of the parameters, demonstrating that the idiosyncrasies of the individual cell cycles are due to different protein concentrations and affinities, while the underlying mechanisms are conserved (Csikasz-Nagy et al., 2006).

By means of a system of ordinary differential equations these models show the change in time (dynamical system) of the protein inside a single typical cell; this type of model is called a deterministic process (whereas a model describing a statistical distribution of protein concentrations in a population of cells is called a stochastic process).

To obtain these equations an iterative series of steps must be done: first the several models and observations are combined to form a consensus diagram and the appropriate kinetic laws are chosen to write the differential equations, such as rate kinetics for stoichiometric reactions, Michaelis-Menten kinetics for enzyme substrate reactions and Goldbeter–Koshland kinetics for ultrasensitive transcription factors, afterwards the parameters of the equations (rate constants, enzyme efficiency coefficients and Michaelis constants) must be fitted to match observations; when they cannot be fitted the kinetic equation is revised and when that is not possible the wiring diagram is modified. The parameters are fitted and validated using observations of both wild type and mutants, such as protein half-life and cell size.

To fit the parameters, the differential equations must be studied. This can be done either by simulation or by analysis. In a simulation, given a starting vector (list of the values of the variables), the progression of the system is calculated by solving the equations at each time-frame in small increments.

 In analysis, the properties of the equations are used to investigate the behavior of the system depending on the values of the parameters and variables. A system of differential equations can be represented as a vector field, where each vector described the change (in concentration of two or more protein) determining where and how fast the trajectory (simulation) is heading. Vector fields can have several special points: a stable point, called a sink, that attracts in all directions (forcing the concentrations to be at a certain value), an unstable point, either a source or a saddle point, which repels (forcing the concentrations to change away from a certain value), and a limit cycle, a closed trajectory towards which several trajectories spiral towards (making the concentrations oscillate).

A better representation, which handles the large number of variables and parameters, is a bifurcation diagram using bifurcation theory. The presence of these special steady-state points at certain values of a parameter (e.g. mass) is represented by a point and once the parameter passes a certain value, a qualitative change occurs, called a bifurcation, in which the nature of the space changes, with profound consequences for the protein concentrations: the cell cycle has phases (partially corresponding to G1 and G2) in which mass, via a stable point, controls cyclin levels, and phases (S and M phases) in which the concentrations change independently, but once the phase has changed at a bifurcation event (Cell cycle checkpoint), the system cannot go back to the previous levels since at the current mass the vector field is profoundly different and the mass cannot be reversed back through the bifurcation event, making a checkpoint irreversible. In particular the S and M checkpoints are regulated by means of special bifurcations called a Hopf bifurcation and an infinite period bifurcation.

Societies
 Jan van der Hoeven Society for Theoretical Biology
 Dutch Society for Theoretical Biology
 Society for Mathematical Biology
 European Society for Mathematical and Theoretical Biology (ESMTB)
 The Israeli Society for Theoretical and Mathematical Biology
 Société Francophone de Biologie Théorique
 International Society for Biosemiotic Studies

Institutes
 National Institute for Mathematical and Biological Synthesis (NIMBioS), University of Tennessee Knoxville
 Mathematical Biosciences Institute (MBI), Ohio State University
 School of Computational and Integrative Sciences, Jawaharlal Nehru University
 Santa Fe Institute
 NSF-Simons National Institute for Theory and Mathematics in Biology (NITMB)

Journals [year established] 
 Acta Biotheoretica [1935]
 Bulletin of Mathematical Biology [1939]
 Journal of Theoretical Biology [1961]
 BioSystems [1967]
 Mathematical Biosciences [1967]
 Theoretical Population Biology [1970]
 Journal of Mathematical Biology [1974]
 Artificial Life [1993]
 Theory in Biosciences [2000]
 Biological Theory [2005]
 Theoretical Ecology [2008]
 Philosophy, Theory, and Practice in Biology [2009]

See also 

 Biological applications of bifurcation theory
 Biophysics
 Biostatistics
 Entropy and life
 Ewens's sampling formula
 Journal of Theoretical Biology
 Logistic function
 Mathematical modelling of infectious disease
 Metabolic network modelling
 Molecular modelling
 Morphometrics
 Population genetics
 Spring school on theoretical biology
 Statistical genetics
 Theoretical ecology
 Turing pattern

Notes

References 

 
 
 
 
 

Biologist Salary | PayScale
"Biologist Salary | Payscale". Payscale.Com, 2021, https://www.payscale.com/research/US/Job=Biologist/Salary. Accessed 3 May 2021. 
Theoretical biology

Further reading

External links 

The Society for Mathematical Biology
The Collection of Biostatistics Research Archive